Richard Barrett Lowe (July 8, 1902 – April 16, 1972) was the governor (and fifth appointed civil governor) of American Samoa (October 1, 1953 – October 15, 1956) and the eighth American governor (and third civilian governor) of Guam (October 15, 1956 – November 14, 1959). He was also a prominent educator and United Nations observer.

Early life and education
Lowe was born on July 8, 1902, in Madison, South Dakota, the youngest of three children. Lowe graduated from Madison High School, and studied at the University of Wisconsin for one year before transferring to the Normal school at Eastern State Teacher's College, where he graduated in 1929. During his senior year, he wrote the premise for and directed the film Dacotah, believed to be the first full-length motion picture filmed entirely on a college campus. Lowe later received his master's degree from the University of South Dakota; he received an honorary Doctor of Education from Ottawa University in 1942.

Career
Following his graduation from Eastern State, Lowe served as an educator and superintendent in various places in South Dakota, eventually becoming president of the South Dakota Education Association.  In February 1946, Lowe became the dean of the Nebraska State Teachers College in Peru, Nebraska. While helping with a Naval Reserves recruiting drive, Lowe convinced those in charge to emphasize the importance of education by using the slogan "Stay in School". Lowe was offered the office of Director of Education, first of American Samoa, and later of Guam in the 1950s, but turned down both positions in hopes of obtaining a governorship.

After his governorships, Lowe became the United Nations observer for the National Education Association in 1964.

Military service
During World War II, Lowe served in the United States Navy as the commanding officer of the V-12 Navy College Training Program at the University of Nebraska and Creighton University. He also served as an officer on Tinian, Guam, and Okinawa Island. In 1947, Lowe assisted in a recruitment drive for the United States Navy Reserve, where he convinced the Navy Recruiting Office to adopt the slogan "Stay in School".

Governorship
For a little less than two weeks in 1953, Lowe was the Governor of two territories simultaneously, the only time this has happened in the 20th century.

American Samoa (1953–56)
Lowe became governor of American Samoa in 1953. While governor, he helped foster the tuna canning industry, now one of American Samoa's primary sources of employment.

Guam (1956–60)
Ford Quint Elvidge resigned the governorship in 1956, and President Dwight Eisenhower appointed Lowe to the governorship. While governor, Lowe appointed many Chamorros to high public office, including the appointment of Manuel Flores Leon Guerrero as Assistant Secretary of Guam. Upon Lowe's resignation in 1960, Eisenhower appointed Joseph Flores, the first Chamorro Governor of the island, as Lowe's replacement.

House Restoration 
After retiring from politics, Lowe began restoring houses in the Washington, D.C., area, including the George Washington Town House in Alexandria, Virginia. Rebuilt in 1960, Lowe used bricks and stones from an excavation of the house and erected the structure on the original foundation.

Personal life 
Lowe died in Alexandria, Virginia, on April 16, 1972, at the age of 69. He is buried at Graceland Cemetery in Madison, South Dakota.

Bibliography
Papers, 1936–70.
Problems in Paradise : The View from Government House. New York: Pageant Press. 1967.

References

External links 

Governors of Guam
Governors of American Samoa
1902 births
1972 deaths
People from Madison, South Dakota
University of South Dakota alumni
United States Navy personnel of World War II
United States Navy officers
Military personnel from South Dakota
20th-century American educators
University of Wisconsin–Madison alumni
American Samoa Republicans
Guamanian Republicans
Burials in South Dakota